Sead Halilagić (born 4 February 1972) is a Serbian-Turkish former footballer of Bosniak descent, who played for several clubs in FR Yugoslavia and Turkey. In his late playing career, he was naturalized as a Turkish citizen under the name Sead Dost.

Playing career

Club
Born in Novi Pazar, SR Serbia, Halilagić joined local club FK Novi Pazar in 1983, and debuted for the first team in the 1988–09 season.  He later played with FK Željezničar Sarajevo and FK Vojvodina in the First League of FR Yugoslavia. for Istanbulspor, Beşiktaş J.K. and Adanaspor in the Turkish Super Lig and for Slavia Sofia in the Bulgarian A PFG. His former coaches are Jonuz Džanković and Ferid Ganić.

Managerial career
After retiring he has received the UEFA Coaching A licence and coached hometown club FK Novi Pazar for a period during the 2006–07 season.

Personal life
Besides being a footballer, Halilagić is also known for being a writer and a poet, with three published books, a short stories compilation Sa obala Tune, and two poetry books, Sazrevanje and Ples.  He has also engaged himself in cinema, by directing a movie called Odbrojavanje in 2002 and his passion is also photography.

References

External links
 Personal site
 Official site

1972 births
Living people
Sportspeople from Novi Pazar
Bosniaks of Serbia
Turkish people of Bosniak descent
Serbian emigrants to Turkey
Turkish people of Serbian descent
Naturalized citizens of Turkey
Association football defenders
Yugoslav footballers
Serbia and Montenegro footballers
Bosnia and Herzegovina footballers
FK Novi Pazar players
FK Željezničar Sarajevo players
FK Vojvodina players
İstanbulspor footballers
Beşiktaş J.K. footballers
PFC Slavia Sofia players
Adanaspor footballers
First League of Serbia and Montenegro players
Süper Lig players
First Professional Football League (Bulgaria) players
Serbia and Montenegro expatriate footballers
Bosnia and Herzegovina expatriate footballers
Expatriate footballers in Turkey
Serbia and Montenegro expatriate sportspeople in Turkey
Bosnia and Herzegovina expatriate sportspeople in Turkey
Expatriate footballers in Bulgaria
Serbia and Montenegro expatriate sportspeople in Bulgaria
Bosnia and Herzegovina expatriate sportspeople in Bulgaria
Bosnia and Herzegovina football managers
FK Novi Pazar managers